The entries in this tabulation cover some 150 years in the 17th and 18th centuries, when the private residents of Covent Garden included many people of rank and note. They ranged from marquesses to barons, foreign ambassadors and members of parliament to physicians, surgeons, antiquaries, artists, authors and dramatists. Some of the later arrivals were auctioneers, such as Christopher Cock and Abraham Langford, who found rich sources for future sales amongst their neighbours. 

Most of the entries are derived from The Piazza: Notable private residents in the Piazza, which in turn is based on Sheppard's Survey of London: Volume 36, Covent Garden. Other sources are noted where appropriate.

References 

People from Covent Garden
Lists of British people